A by-election for the constituency of Batley and Morley in the United Kingdom House of Commons was held on 17 February 1949, caused by the death of the incumbent Labour MP Hubert Beaumont. The result was a hold for the Labour Party, with their candidate Alfred Broughton.

Result

Previous election

References

 Craig, F. W. S. (1983) [1969]. British parliamentary election results 1918-1949 (3rd edition ed.). Chichester: Parliamentary Research Services. .
 

By-elections to the Parliament of the United Kingdom in Leeds constituencies
Batley and Morley by-election
Batley and Morley by-election
Batley and Morley by-election, 1949
Batley and Morley by-election, 1949
Batley and Morley by-election